The following is a list of 1992 Seattle Mariners draft picks. The list includes the June regular draft (Rule 4 draft). The Mariners made 50 selections in the June regular draft, and of those picks 31 were pitchers, 6 were outfielders, 4 were catchers, 4 were third basemen, 2 were first basemen, 2 were shortstops, and 1 was a second baseman.

Draft

Key

Table

References
General references

Inline citations

External links
Seattle Mariners official website